888 Seventh Avenue is a 628 ft (191m) tall modern-style office skyscraper in Midtown Manhattan which was completed in 1969 and has 46 floors. Emery Roth & Sons designed the building. 888 Seventh Avenue is "L"-shaped in plan, with wings extending north to 57th Street and east to Seventh Avenue, around the adjacent Rodin Studios. It currently carries the Vornado Realty Trust corporate headquarters. Previously known as the Arlen Building, it had been named for the company responsible for its construction, Arlen Realty & Development Corporation. The Red Eye Grill is located in the building at street level. 

Moed de Armas renovated the Lobby, Elevators & Plaza in 2006, cladding them with white marble. The HVAC was also extensively renovated and the building was later given gold certification by the Leadership in Energy and Environmental Design.

The building is assigned its own ZIP Code, 10106; it was one of 41 buildings in Manhattan that had their own ZIP Codes .

Tenants
Fordham University
The Fireman Hospitality Group
Protiviti
TPG Capital
Casimir Capital
Tulsiani Spectre Trust
Pershing Square Capital Management
Visium Asset Management
Vornado Realty Trust
Pura Vida Investments
Lombard Odier Asset Management
Drake Real Estate Partners
Caravel Management
United Talent Agency
Corcoran Sunshine Marketing Group
Cumming Corporation
Schreck Rose Dapello Adams Berlin & Dunham
Colbeck Capital

See also
List of tallest buildings in New York City

References
Skyscraperpage

57th Street (Manhattan)
Emery Roth buildings
Leadership in Energy and Environmental Design gold certified buildings
Midtown Manhattan
Office buildings completed in 1969
Seventh Avenue (Manhattan)
Skyscraper office buildings in Manhattan